The United Party of Roma in Macedonia (Obedineta partija na Romite vo Makedonija) is a political party in North Macedonia. 

At the last legislative elections, 15 September 2002, the party won 1 out of 120 seats as part of the Together for Macedonia alliance, led by the Social Democratic Union of Macedonia and the Liberal Democratic Party.

Political parties of minorities in North Macedonia
Romani political parties